This is a list of hospitals in Venezuela.

Caracas

Hospital Clínicas Caracas - Caracas
Centro Médico de Caracas
Hospital Dr.José María Vargas
Hospital Clínico Universitario
Hospital de Niños J. M. de los Ríos
Hospital Domingo Luciani
Hospital Dr.José Gregorio Hernández
Hospital "Miguel Perez Carreño"
Hospital Médico Quirúrgico "Dr.Ricardo Baquero Gonzalez"
Hospital Psiquiatrico de Caracas
Hospital Periférico de Coche "Leopoldo Manrique Terrero"
Centro Medico Docente La Trinidad - Caracas
Hospital General Lidice Jesús Yerena - Caracas
Hospital Dr. Perez de León
Hospital Dr.José Ignacio Baldó
Hospital Militar "Dr.Carlos Arvelo"
Hospital Militar "Dr. Vicente Salias"

Maracay

Hospital Central de Maracay

Carabobo

Ciudad Hospitalaria "Dr. Enrique Tejera" 
Hospital Central "Dr. Ramon Madariaga"
Hospital de Clinica "San Augustin"

Guarico

Hospital Rafael Zamora Arevalo- Guarico
Hospital General William Lara
Hospital Dr. Israel Ranuarez Balza- Guarico

Sucre

Hospital Ruiz & Paez

Zulia

Hospital Universitario de Maracibo

Barinas

Hospital Luis Razetti - Barinas

For a complete list, go to:  https://web.archive.org/web/20180929231253/http://www.paginasamarillascantv.com.ve/.  Where it says "Clasificación", select Clínicas y Hospitales, and where it says "Ciudad", select "Todas las Ciudades".  There are about 2,018 clinics and hospitals in Venezuela, 634 in Caracas, 195 in Maracaibo, 173 in Valencia, and 92 in Barquisimeto.

Venezuela

Hospitals
Venezuela